Norman Ormal was a 1998 political satire scripted by Craig Brown in which Harry Enfield played a former Conservative MP who became a Blair advisor.

References

Political drama films
1998 television specials
BBC television dramas